The Solomon Mahlangu Freedom College (SOMAFCO), was an educational institution established by the exiled African National Congress (ANC) in 1978 at Mazimbu, Tanzania. Its purpose was to give the youth that had fled South Africa after the 1976 Soweto uprising and children of existing exiles a primary and secondary education, an alternative to traditional Bantu education system they would have received at home. It would teach both an academic and vocational education. Farmlands would supply food to the institution and would also include a hospital. It was officially opened by Oliver Tambo in 1985.

History 
The ANC's would establish its educational centre in Morogoro, Tanzania on land donated by the Tanzanian government during 1977, facilitated by Tanzanian Anna Abdallah. The land at Mazimbu, consisted of some farm buildings on 600 acres. The school would be named after Solomon Mahlangu, a member of the ANC's military wing, Umkhonto we Sizwe (MK) and an exile of the 1976 Soweto uprising. Other names that had been suggested for the school before settled on the existing name were the Albert Luthuli Institute and the ANC Freedom School.

The complex was built by Oswald Dennis, an ANC civil engineer trained in East Germany. He would later be supported by architect Spenser Hodgson. Work started in July 1977, built by Tanzanian labourers and supervised by the ANC, while education began under trees or in the existing farm buildings. Eventually around eighty percent of the workforce would be made of Tanzanians. As this would be a boarding school, accommodation was required and so six units catering for 144 pupils were built, with eight students per room. The first dormitory was completed for occupation in late 1979 by pupils and teachers. By 1980, the land had been cleared, existing houses on the land renovated, a temporary water supply and sewage system in place and the buildings linked to the local electricity network. Future plans called for more dormitories, houses, kitchen and dining rooms as well as a library.

Initially the plan for the facility was for a secondary school for exiles of the 1976 Soweto uprising and children of the pre-1976, but soon a pre-primary school was established and by 1984 it would be formally called the Charlotte Maxeke Children's Centre. The centre started in the late 70's as a crèche, first in the town itself before being moved back into a renovated house at SOMAFCO in 1981 as a crèche and nursery school. The centre would open in 1984, built by Oswald Dennis from money supplied by the Swedish Teachers' Union.

By 1985 a primary school was formally established. In 1980, New Zealanders Terry and Barbara Bell arrived in Tanzania to establish the primary school which operated out of one of the renovated houses though overcrowding meant some had to attend primary school in town. All teaching occurred in English. The Bell's left in 1982 after clashing over the style of the school management. Dennis and Hazel September took over the management of the primary school and the style of teaching changed to a more conventional one of grade and performance measures.

Food for the facility was supplied from the farms' land which would supply milk, eggs, pork, beef and maize. Hans Jurgen's expertise as an agricultural consultant would provided by the Swedish International Development Cooperation Agency. He would set about constructing a farm plan to make the facility self-sufficient by 1984 for 2,500 residents. Teachers and students were expected spend a time each week working on the farms. Security for the complex was provided by the Tanzania People's Defence Force.

Medical issues were initially conducted by a clinic at the institution but when politics and personal issues took hold there in the early eighties and with the increase in the need to supply more sophisticated medical treatments, the ANC decided that a hospital should be built. Later called the ANC-Holland Solidarity Hospital, it was opened on 1 May 1984. A solidarity group in the Netherlands under Henk Odenk would finance it and the ANC was responsible for its construction.

The furniture factory was financed out of Finland and would open in 1980 and was called the Vuyisile Mini Furniture Factory, named after Vuyisile Mini an executed MK soldier. In addition to repairing broken furniture it would supply the building projects with doors, window frames and furniture.

Teaching and curriculum 
Teachers where recruited from three main sources. Firstly from ANC members with professional qualifications, secondly from matriculated members of the organisation and lastly overseas volunteer teachers who supported the aims of the ANC. The ANC wished to emphasise the teaching of what it called the hard sciences, subjects such as science and biology, subjects that were not regularly taught to black pupils in South Africa under the governments Bantu Education policy and which there was a shortage of amongst its own teachers. The source of teachers would initially come from Europe such as the United Kingdom, Nordic countries, the Netherlands and GDR and then later from Nigeria, Zambia and Tanzania.

The students were educated only in English, with both a traditional non-Bantu education and political education. Subjects by the late 80's included English, Maths, History, Geography, Chemistry, Biology, Physics, Agricultural Science, Typing, Integrated Science, Technical drawing, Development of Societies, Literature and History of the Struggle. The latter three were examined internally with the other subjects examined externally in the UK as GCE O level examinations. The secondary school consisted of six forms or grades and classes took place from Monday to Friday with a uniform worn though not strictly enforced. Corporal punishment though not officially allowed did occur from time to time and depended on the teacher concerned.

Tertiary education was not conducted by the college but through means of scholarships, worthy candidates received further education in British, European and American universities while Communist countries also assisted but mainly in the spheres of agriculture, paramedical workers and engineers as well as other technical skills.

Chief Administrator / Director of schools 

 1982 - 1986 Mohammed Tikly
 1987 - 1988 Tim Maseko
 1989 - 1992 Alpheus Mangezi

Secondary School Principals 

 Oct 1978 Winston Njobe
 1981 - 1985 Tim Maseko
 1986 - 1990 Andrew Masondo
 1990 - 1991 Don Mgakana
 1991 - 1992 Ray Marutle

Vice-Principal - Slim Zindela

Teachers and alumni 
 Lionel Bernstein - teacher
 Ruth First - history curriculum
 John Pampallis - teacher
 Jack Simons - teacher
 Lindiwe Zulu - alumna
 Peter Knoope - teacher 
·Aubrey Matlole - teacher
·Zandisile Pase - teacher
·Mzwandile Kibi - teacher

Financial backers 
The Solomon Mahlangu Freedom College would receive its funds from foreign donors. Most of the ANCs Scandinavian countries donations went into education with Norway and Sweden contributing $12 million in 1985 and $25 million by 1988. The latter's aid was provided by the Swedish International Developmental Cooperation Agency. Other donations for the work came from the German Democratic Republic, Soviet Union, United Nations Development Programme, World Health Organization (WHO) solidarity organisations and individuals.

Closure 
On its closure on 9 September 1992, the educational complex consisted of a pre-primary, primary and secondary school, the farm, furniture factory and other support units. The infrastructure that remained behind was integrated into the Sokoine University of Agriculture. In 1991, the National Co-ordinating Committee on for the Return of Exiles set up the Batlagae Trust, who through the means of bursaries, would integrate the school's pupils back into the South African education system on their return to the country.

The school's archives now rest at the University of Fort Hare. The documents began to arrive in September 1992 and stored in Centre for Cultural Studies before being moved to the Howard Pim Library in 1995.

References

Anti-Apartheid organisations
Educational institutions established in 1978
History of the African National Congress